Miguel Ernesto Herrera Aguirre (born 18 March 1968), popularly referred to by his nickname "Piojo" (Spanish for "louse"), is a Mexican former professional footballer and current manager. He is the head coach of Liga MX club Tijuana.

A former defender, Herrera began his career playing with second division side Deportivo Neza in 1985, then transferring to Tecos UAG in 1987, and making his debut in the Primera División in 1988. After a brief period with Santos Laguna, in 1989 Herrera transferred to Atlante and went on to play for the club on three occasions, winning his only league championship as a player during the 1992–93 season. He also had a notable spell with Toros Neza, making over 100 appearances for the club from 1995 till 1999. He retired with Atlante in 2000. Herrera was also a Mexican international, earning 14 caps and participated in the 1993 Copa América tournament in which Mexico finished runner-up.

As a manager, Herrera was in charge of Atlante in 2002, and again in 2010. He also coached Monterrey, managing them to two finals in 2004 and 2005, losing to UNAM and Toluca. He went on to coach Veracruz in 2008, and Estudiantes Tecos from 2008 until 2010. In November 2011, Herrera was announced as manager of Club América, with which he won his first league championship in 2013. In 2018, he won a second Liga MX title in his second spell with the club.

In October 2013, Herrera was named interim coach of the Mexico national team to guide them through the intercontinental playoff matches against New Zealand to qualify for the 2014 World Cup. After Mexico won the playoff and gained qualification, Herrera's job was extended to coaching the team during the World Cup. He ultimately extended his contract until 2018. Despite leading Mexico to the 2015 CONCACAF Gold Cup, he was sacked as coach of the national team after a physical altercation with a journalist.

Club career
Herrera made his debut in 1985 with second division side Deportivo Neza. Originally a forward, he switched to playing as a defender after his move to Tecos UAG in 1987. Herrera made his debut in the Primera División on 22 May 1988 in a 2–0 victory over Atlas. He transferred to Santos Laguna in 1988, making 30 appearances and scoring four goals. He had his first stint with Atlante in 1989, making 36 appearances and scoring four goals before moving to Querétaro in 1990. He again transferred to Atlante in 1991, and won his first league title during the 1992–93 season after defeating Monterrey in the finals by a 4–0 aggregate score after winning the first-leg 1–0 and the second 4–0. He would remain at the club until 1995, making 125 appearances and scoring nine goals. Herrera was then sold to Toros Neza, with whom he would play in his second league final during the "Verano '97" season, ultimately losing to Guadalajara by an aggregate score of 7–2. In 1999, Herrera returned to Atlante for a third time before officially retiring in 2000.

International career
Herrera participated with the senior national team in the 1993 Copa América tournament held in Ecuador. Mexico went on to reach the final against Argentina, losing 1–2.

Herrera played in all of Mexico's matches during the qualifying stages for the 1994 FIFA World Cup, though he was omitted from the final squad list by coach Miguel Mejía Barón.

Managerial career

Atlante
In 2002, two years after retiring, Herrera came back to coach his former club Atlante. He would remain manager for two years, but resigned in 2004 after failing to take Atlante to a final.

Monterrey
For the Apertura 2004, Herrera was named head coach of Monterrey. He coincidentally faced his former club Atlante in the semifinals, with Monterrey advancing by an aggregate score of 7–3. He ultimately failed to make Monterrey champions, losing to UNAM in the final by an aggregate score of 3–1. He succeeded in taking Monterrey to another final in the Apertura 2005 tournament, but failed once more, this time losing to Toluca with an aggregate score of 6–3. Herrera would continue to be manager of Monterrey until the Apertura 2007 tournament, where his contract was terminated in September 2007 due to continuous poor form.

Veracruz
Prior to the Clausura 2008, Herrera was hired as manager of Veracruz after the resignation of Antonio Mohamed. A stand-out victory for Herrera was a 4–0 home victory over Club América on 29 March 2008. He was in charge of preventing Veracruz from being relegated to the Primera División A, though Veracruz were inevitably relegated. Herrera parted ways with the club in May 2008.

Estudiantes Tecos
Shortly after leaving Veracruz, Herrera was hired to manage a struggling Estudiantes Tecos midway into the Apertura 2008 tournament to replace José Luis Trejo. He was fired on 6 September 2010 after Tecos suffered a 0–3 defeat against Guadalajara during a league match of the Apertura tournament.

Return to Atlante
In November 2010 it was announced that Herrera was hired as the new Atlante manager, returning to his former club following his first managerial stint in 2002. Under his reign, Atlante finished fourth in the Clausura 2011, though they would be eliminated in the quarterfinals by Cruz Azul. Atlante failed to qualify for the playoffs of the Apertura 2011, and Herrera did not renew his contract with the club. There were reports linking him with Club América as their new manager for the following season.

América
On 16 November 2011, Herrera was officially named manager of Club América. In his first press conference, Herrera revealed he had signed a six-month contract, saying, "[i]f in six months I don't give results, I’ll leave." On 7 January 2012, América defeated Querétaro 2–0, which was Herrera's first official victory with América. América finished the Clausura in third place and reached the semifinals, being eliminated by Monterrey by an aggregate score of 0–2. On 14 May, Miguel Herrera was ratified as manager. He led the club to a fourth-place finish the following Apertura, once again being eliminated at the semifinals stage following a 2–3 aggregate loss to Toluca.

On 26 May 2013, América won the eleventh league title in its history by defeating Cruz Azul 4–2 on penalties after a dramatic comeback from a 0–1 first leg loss to tie 2–2 on aggregate, and playing the second leg with ten men for over 105 minutes. It was Herrera's first title in his managerial career after losing his two previous finals while at Monterrey.

The following Apertura, Herrera led América to another league final after topping the league table with 37 points, however they were defeated by León. Midway through the tournament, Herrera was named interim coach of the Mexico national team; his assistant Álvaro Galindo coached América until Herrera's return in November. It was later announced that Herrera would take over as head coach of the Mexican team on a permanent basis.

Mexico national team

On 18 October 2013, Herrera was appointed interim head coach of the Mexico, replacing Víctor Manuel Vucetich to become the fourth national team coach within the span of a month. He led El Tri to a 9–3 aggregate victory over New Zealand in the inter-confederation play-off to qualify for the 2014 World Cup in Brazil. On 2 December, it was announced that Herrera would remain national team coach at least through the World Cup.

At the World Cup, Mexico finished second in their group with 7 points, obtaining wins against Cameroon and Croatia and securing a scoreless draw against the host nation.
They faced the Netherlands in the round-of-16, where Mexico was controversially eliminated after succumbing to a 2–1 defeat. On 3 December, he declared that his contract with the national team was renewed.

Mexico failed to make it past the group stage of the 2015 Copa América, only attaining two draws and one loss. On 26 July 2015, Mexico won the CONCACAF Gold Cup after defeating Jamaica 3–1 in the final. Two days later, Herrera was released as coach of the Mexico national team after an alleged physical altercation with TV Azteca announcer Christian Martinoli – who had been critical of Herrera – while the two waited in the TSA line at the Philadelphia International Airport.

Tijuana
On 2 November 2015, Herrera was named manager of Club Tijuana. He managed the club until May 2017, qualifying to the play-offs twice.

Return to América
On 26 May 2017, newly appointed sporting president Santiago Baños officially announced Herrera's return to Club América. He lost in his first official game as the club's manager, a 1–2 defeat to Querétaro in the Supercopa MX. Six days later, América again lost to Querétaro, this time by a 0–1 scoreline, in their opening match of the Apertura tournament. The following week, Herrera won his first league match in his second spell with América, defeating Pachuca 2–0 at Estadio Hidalgo. Herrera led América to a third-place finish during the regular phase of the Apertura, however they were eliminated in the semifinals by Tigres UANL. América also went out of the 2018 CONCACAF Champions League to Toronto FC in the semifinals. The club finished the following Clausura tournament in second-place, and was again eliminated at the semifinal stage, this time losing to Santos Laguna by a 6–3 aggregate score.

Herrera led América to another second-place finish in the 2018 Apertura, only suffering two defeats throughout the regular phase of the tournament, and went undefeated in the playoffs. On 16 December, Herrera won his second league title – both with Club América – following a 2–0 aggregate victory over Cruz Azul in the finals. He also led the team on a 17-game unbeaten streak en route to winning the championship, equaling the record set by the club under Mario Carrillo in 2005 when it won that year's Clausura.

On 5 February 2019, Herrera reached 100 wins in charge of Club América following a 3–1 victory over Necaxa in the Copa MX, becoming the third manager in the club's history after Jose Antonio Roca and Carlos Reinoso to reach that milestone. On 11 April, América defeated FC Juárez 1–0 in the Clausura final of the Copa MX. This was Herrera's first cup title in his career, and his third title overall with Club América.

On 21 December 2020, two days after being eliminated by Los Angeles FC from the CONCACAF Champions League where he was involved in a halftime brawl, Herrera was sacked by América.

Tigres UANL
On 20 May 2021, Herrera was appointed manager of Tigres UANL, replacing Ricardo Ferretti. On 9 November 2022, Herrera was dismissed from his job.

Return to Tijuana
On 10 February 2023, Club Tijuana announced Herrera as their new manager.

Managerial style
Herrera is a known "Lavolpista", a term used to describe coaches that follow the style and philosophy of Ricardo La Volpe, although Herrera has stated he isn't, arguing he incorporates footballing styles from various other coaches he has trained with. Most of them use the 5–3–2 formation with fast wing-backs. Herrera has been criticized for deploying a "pyrotechnic" style with offensive and direct game that sometimes leaves the defense vulnerable. He transferred over the formation from Club América to national level when he was made Mexico's manager.

Managerial statistics

Honours

Player
Atlante
 Primera División: 1992–93

Manager
América
 Liga MX: Clausura 2013, Apertura 2018
 Copa MX: Clausura 2019
 Campeón de Campeones: 2019

Mexico
 CONCACAF Gold Cup: 2015

Individual
 Mexican Primera División Manager of the Tournament: Apertura 2002

References

External links

Miguel Herrera as a coach at MedioTiempo.com
Miguel Herrera as player at MedioTiempo.com

1968 births
Living people
Footballers from Hidalgo (state)
Mexican football managers
Liga MX players
Atlante F.C. footballers
Santos Laguna footballers
Querétaro F.C. footballers
C.F. Monterrey managers
C.D. Veracruz managers
Tecos F.C. managers
Club América managers
Toros Neza footballers
Mexico national football team managers
2014 FIFA World Cup managers
Mexico international footballers
2015 Copa América managers
2015 CONCACAF Gold Cup managers
CONCACAF Gold Cup-winning managers
Club Tijuana managers
Liga MX managers
Association football defenders
Mexican footballers